Subtropical Storm Ubá was the fourth tropical or subtropical cyclone to form in the South Atlantic Ocean in 2021. Ubá originated from an area of low pressure that formed off the coast of Rio de Janeiro and evolved into a subtropical cyclone on 10 December. The cyclone lingered for two days, before weakening back to a low-pressure area and dissipating on 13 December. Together with the South Atlantic Convergence Zone (SACZ), Ubá caused heavy rains in Minas Gerais, in Espírito Santo and mainly in Bahia. The storm became the deadliest South Atlantic (sub)tropical cyclone, with a death toll of 15.

Meteorological history 
The low-pressure system formed off the coast of Rio de Janeiro and evolved into a subtropical cyclone. More than 30 municipalities in Bahia decreed state of emergency because of heavy rains and ten people died in the state.

On 10 December, the cyclone evolved and gave rise to a subtropical depression on the coast of southern Brazil, according to a synoptic chart from the Brazilian Navy. In the morning of the same day, according to the CHM, the system evolved into a subtropical storm and was named Ubá.

On 12 December, the system was lowered to a subtropical depression upon exiting METAREA V and a day later, encountering cooler waters and of wind shear, it was lowered again to a low pressure common at sea.

Impact

Floods in Minas Gerais
In the Jequitinhonha Valley, in Minas Gerais, the rain caused by ZCAS and this subtropical cyclone caused flooding, with the Jucuruçu River overflowing. Another 5 deaths from these systems were reported., a dam overflowed in Crisólita and in the city of Monte Formoso, were registered . 31 cities in Minas Gerais were in a state of emergency.

Floods in southern Bahia 
The floods in southern Bahia began on 7 December 2021, with heavy rains that hit the region. Among the most affected cities in south of the state are Itamaraju, Eunápolis and Itabela, where a strong rise in river levels and slides of land. Other cities are also being affected, requiring air assistance to rescue and supply basic items. In Ilhéus, the pool of a luxury resort overflowed, and some guests had to be transferred to another hotel  The government of Bahia decreed an emergency situation in 24 municipalities on the 9th. News of deaths and disappearances circulated in the media, more than a thousand displaced people are estimated.

See also

Weather of 2021
Tropical cyclones of 2021

References

External links 

2021 meteorology
Ubá
Ubá
South Atlantic tropical cyclones
Tropical cyclones in Brazil